National Route 59 (N59) is a primary national route that forms part of the Philippine highway network, running from Antipolo, Rizal to Cubao, Quezon City, Metro Manila.

Route description
N59 follows a route that runs from Antipolo to Cainta in Rizal, which then enters Metro Manila through Pasig then Marikina towards Quezon City. The highway connects most major regional centers on its route, and runs through different landscapes. The highway continues westward as N180 highway and eastward as N600 highway.

Sumulong Highway

N59 begins at Antipolo in Rizal at the endpoint of L. Sumulong Memorial Circle Road (N600) in front of Robinsons Place Antipolo. The highway passes through different key locations at Antipolo known for its scenic views of Metro Manila given its mountainous terrain. The roadway goes downward until it meets with Marikina-Infanta Highway at the Masinag Junction wherein the N59 route turns left.

Marikina–Infanta Highway

As soon as it turns left, the highway soon enters the Marikina–Infanta Highway (Marcos Highway) where it follows the LRT Line 2 from Masinag Junction, Antipolo, Rizal, where it begins on a straight route as it crosses over to Cainta. N59 then enters Metro Manila in Pasig and Marikina at the Felix Avenue and Gil Fernando Avenue intersection. N59 then crosses the Marikina River veering upwards in a curve towards its junction with A. Bonifacio Avenue. It then enters Quezon City before it terminates at C-5/Katipunan Avenue (N11) and Aurora Boulevard (N59) intersection. The LRT Line 2 utilizes the center island of Marikina-Infanta Highway on all segments of N59.

Aurora Boulevard

Entering Quezon City, N59 follows Aurora Boulevard which runs on a four to six-lane highway passing through intersections such as Anonas Street in Project 3, 20th Avenue in Project 4, and Araneta City streets in Cubao. It then terminates at its intersection with EDSA (N1/AH26) wherein it continues westward after the intersection as N180 highway but still as Aurora Boulevard. The LRT Line 2 utilizes the center island of Aurora Boulevard on all segments.

References

Roads in Rizal
Roads in Metro Manila